Lincoln College of New England was a private college in Southington, Connecticut, founded in 1966 as Briarwood College. Lincoln's regional accreditor placed the college on probation in the summer of 2018 and the institution subsequently stopped admitting students and announced that it would close in December.

Lincoln was known for its criminal justice, dental hygiene, mortuary science, nursing, and occupational therapy assistant programs.

As of the Spring Semester 2015, Lincoln was the only institution in Connecticut offering a mortuary program.

Lincoln College offered a total of 24 degree programs including legal assisting, medical assisting, and clinical assisting. The tuition for Lincoln was, on average, approximately $16,400 per year with additional fees averaging $300. On-campus housing was available for up to 300 students, with average room prices around $3,600 per year per student.

References

External links
 Official website

Buildings and structures in Southington, Connecticut
Private universities and colleges in Connecticut
Educational institutions established in 1966
Former women's universities and colleges in the United States
Universities and colleges in Hartford County, Connecticut
1966 establishments in Connecticut
2018 disestablishments in Connecticut
Educational institutions disestablished in 2018
NJCAA athletics